Hire is an unincorporated community in Cherry County, Nebraska, United States.

History
A post office was established at Hire in 1911, and remained in operation until it was discontinued in 1943. The community was named for John C. Hire, a pioneer settler.

References

Unincorporated communities in Cherry County, Nebraska
Unincorporated communities in Nebraska